Socket 60x may refer to:

 Socket 603
 Socket 604